The 1905 WAFA season was the 21st season of senior Australian rules football in Perth, Western Australia. This was the first year where the Grand Final results became a draw.

Ladder

Grand Final

Grand final replay

References

West Australian Football League seasons
WAFL